Barefoot Sunday Blues is an album by Ramsey Lewis Trio featuring tracks recorded in 1963 and released on the Argo label.

Reception

Allmusic awarded the album 3 stars.

Track listing
All compositions by Ramsey Lewis except as indicated
 "Lonely Avenue" (Doc Pomus) - 2:56 
 "Don't Even Kick It Around" - 4:26  
 "Salute to Ray Charles" - 5:51 
 "Barefoot Sunday Blues" (Cannonball Adderley) - 3:35  
 "Island Blues" (Charles Lloyd) - 2:47 
 "I Spend My Life" (Eldee Young) - 3:42
 "Act Like You Mean It" (Young) - 2:25
 "Sarah Jane"  (Dave Grusin) - 5:20
 "The Train Won't Wait" - 3:02
 "Come on Baby" (Lewis, Isaac Holt) - 2:30

Personnel 
Ramsey Lewis - piano
Eldee Young - bass, cello
Christopher White - bass (tracks 1 & 7)
Issac "Red" Holt - drums

References 

1963 albums
Ramsey Lewis albums
Argo Records albums
Albums produced by Esmond Edwards
Albums recorded at Van Gelder Studio